Robert Bamford (16 June 1883 – 16 April 1942) was an English engineer, who with Lionel Martin (1878–1945), founded a company in January 1913 that became Aston Martin. Before his career in the car industry he was active as a racing cyclist.

Early life
He was born on 16 June 1883 at Lamarsh in Essex to the Rev. Robert Bamford (1854–1898) and Blanch Edith Bamford (née Porter) (1856-1936).

The Rev. Robert Bamford served as curate of Thornbury, Gloucestershire (1880-1881), curate of St John's, Ladywood, Birmingham (1881-1882), curate of Lamarsh, Essex (1882-1885), curate of Holy Trinity, Lambeth (1885-1886). In about 1892, he resigned his curacy due to ill health and settled in Sherborne, Dorset, living at Lynton House (now Abbot's Litten) in Long Street, Sherborne. From 1895 to 1898 he served as secretary to the Yeatman Hospital, Sherborne, and died at Sherborne on 9 November 1898, aged 44, and was buried in Sherborne Cemetery. After the Rev. Bamford's death Blanch married the Rev. Thomas Myers and lived at 89, Bloomfield Avenue, Bath, later at Milking Close, Ditchling, East Sussex, where she died and was buried.

He had two brothers, Edward Bamford DSO VC (1887-1928) and Arthur Bamford (1889-1915), and a sister Rachel Bamford (1885-1974).

Edward Bamford DSO VC (1887–1928), who was educated at Sherborne Preparatory School, and Sherborne School as a day boy 1900–1902. In 1905 he joined the Royal Marine Light Infantry and served in HMS Bulwark, HMS Magnificent, HMS Britannia, HMS Chester, HMS Royal Sovereign, and HMS Highflyer. During the First World War as Brevet Major on HMS Royal Sovereign. He was mentioned in despatches and awarded the DSO, Order of St Anne (3rd Class, Russian), the Légion d’Honneur, and the Victoria Cross 'For conspicuous gallantry at Zeebrugge.  April 1918. This officer landed on the Mole from "Vindictive" with Nos. 5, 7 & 8 platoons of the Marine Storming Force in the face of great difficulties.  When on the Mole under heavy fire, he displayed the greatest initiative in the command of his company, and by his total disregard of danger, showed a magnificent example to his men.  He first established a strong point on the right of the disembarkation, and when that was safe, led an assault on a battery to the left with the utmost coolness and valour.  Captain Bamford was selected by the officers of the R.M.A & R.M.L.I. detachments to receive the Victoria Cross under Rule 13 of the Royal Warrant, dated 26 January 1856.'. He died at Shanghai in 1928. On 17 April 2018, Haringey Council unveiled a paving stone in memory of Edward Bamford VC at 151 Park Road, London N8 8JD.

Rachel Bamford (1885-1974). In 1911, Rachel was a student at the Colonial Training College at Stoke Prior, Bromsgrove, Worcestershire. During the First World War she served in the Women's Army Auxiliary Corps (WAAC).

Arthur Bamford (1889-1915), was educated at Sherborne School as a day boy 1903–1905. He went to Australia in 1910–1912, and in 1913 was employed as a professional musician. During the First World War he served as a Private in the Grenadier Guards. He was killed near Loos on 11 October 1915 and is commemorated at St Mary's A.D.S. Cemetery, Haisnes, IX.D.13, and on the Sherborne School War Memorial

Robert Bamford attended Sherborne School as a day boy from May 1897 to April 1900. During the First World War he served for one year as private in The London Regiment, 25th (County of London) Cyclist Battalion, and then as a lieutenant with the Army Service Corps (RASC), Mechanical Transport.

Bamford, historically, is a Lancashire surname.

Career

Aston Martin
Bamford & Martin Ltd was founded at 16 Henniker Place in West Kensington (off Fulham Road – the A308) on 15 January 1913. They produced their first Aston-Martin car, the Coal Scuttle, in March 1915. Robert Bamford was the engineer of the partnership.
In 1920 he retired from Bamford & Martin; Lionel Martin left in 1926. In the mid-1920s the company would undergo many changes of ownership. It would be largely through the ownership of David Brown Ltd. of Huddersfield that Aston-Martin would become the company renowned during the 1950s, who bought Aston-Martin for £20,500 (£,000 current value) in 1947.

He was inducted into the Automotive Hall of Fame in 2013.

Personal life
In 1911 he was living at 41 Twickenham Road in Teddington. He became engaged to fashion designer Muriel Matilda Etches (born 1898) in May 1918, the eldest daughter of C.T.W. Etches. They were married in 1919 in Newton Abbot in Devon. They had a daughter, Patricia, born in Brentford in Middlesex in 1921, and she married the illustrator Robin Jacques in 1943.

By 1939, Robert had retired to South Street, Ditchling, East Sussex Sussex, where he died on 16 April 1942, aged 59. He was buried at St Margaret's, Ditchling. His headstone reads: 'Motor Engineer Founder of Bamford & Martin later to become Aston Martin. Also his mother Blanche Edith Myers 26 May 1856–5 Mar 1946 [Around the edge] The clocks, folk and pubs of Ditchling will miss him.'

References

External links
 Grace's Guide

1883 births
1942 deaths
Aston Martin
British automotive pioneers
British founders of automobile manufacturers
People from Braintree District
People from Ditchling
Royal Army Service Corps officers
British Army personnel of World War I